AHDB Potatoes, previously known as the Potato Council, is a trade organisation that aims to develop and promote the potato industry in Great Britain. Previously an independent non-departmental public body, it has been a division of the Agriculture and Horticulture Development Board since 1 April 2008.

History
Set up to replace the Potato Marketing Board, the Potato Council was originally known as the Potato Industry Development Council, and then the British Potato Council until April 2008.

Potato Marketing Board
The organisation was originally established in 1934 as the Potato Marketing Board by the Potato Marketing Scheme (Approval) Order (Great Britain) 1933, under powers given to potato producers under the Agricultural Marketing Acts of 1931 and 1933. The Scheme was mainly set up as a preventative measure against the unstable market conditions that previously existed in the 1920s and 1930s. With this in mind, the Board was to register producers, prohibit sales by unregistered producers, regulate marketing of the industry, encourage co-operation between sellers and producers and in promoting education and research in the field.

Upon the outbreak of the Second World War, the Ministry of Food took control over all agricultural production, including potatoes. With the passing of the Potato Marketing Scheme 1933 (Modification and Suspension) Order 1939, all Board's activities were suspended.

In 1955, the Potato Marketing Scheme (Approval) Order 1955 repealed the previous order and created a new, but very similar entity. Amendments to the scheme commenced in 1962, 1971, 1976, 1985, 1987 and 1990. The Board was largely producer-elected, however had a few ministerial appointees. Many of its powers were delegated to committees such as the Executive Committee and the Retailers' Committee. In 1958, The Board bought former RAF base, RAF Sutton Bridge in Lincolnshire, and set up an Agricultural experiment station, now known as Sutton Bridge Crop Storage Research, the biggest centre of its kind in the UK.

British Potato Council
In 1997, under the Potato Industry Development Council Order 1997, the name was changed to the British Potato Council. It levied farmers under powers originally delegated from the Industrial Organisation and Development Act 1947 but now through powers granted to its parent organisation. It was also funded through the Scottish Executive Environment and Rural Affairs Department (SEERAD) and the National Assembly for Wales Agriculture Department (NAWAD).

In 2005 a report by Daniel Lewis from the Efficiency in Government Unit (jointly sponsored by the Centre for Policy Studies and the Economic Research Council), called The Essential Guide to British Quangos, looked into the role of Quangos in British politics and potential efficiency savings that could be made. The report named the British Potato Council as one of the nine "most useless quangos". In 2008, it was merged with other similar levy-funded organisations to form the Agriculture and Horticulture Development Board, where it operates as a specialist division focused on the potato industry.

Even though it received its £6m funding in 2007 solely from British farmers, it was forced to drop the word "British" from its name due to EU rules. This was to avoid the impression that it receives state subsidies.

Description
AHDB Potatoes works to improve the competitiveness and sustainability of potato growers, while also promoting the alleged health benefits of potatoes. The Council invests in teaching children about healthy eating and showing how potatoes are grown. Many of the industry's farmers spend time working with children in schools and on their farms, showing how they plant, grow and harvest their crops.

Its publication is the Potato Weekly, which mainly lists current prices of potatoes per tonne. It visits agricultural shows and extols the virtues and health benefits of potatoes, with a resident cook on hand.

Its main functions are:
 To promote potatoes to customers at home and abroad
 To encourage and commission research into improving the efficiency of potato production and their sale
 To offer advice to other parts of government and other farming organisations
 To provide statistical information on the UK potato industry

AHDB Potatoes raises all of its money from a compulsory levy paid to AHDB by potato growers and seed merchants and receives no funding from the government. The grower levy is £42.62 per hectare and the purchaser levy is £0.1858 per tonne. Its main base is at Stoneleigh Park in Warwickshire, and there is a Scottish office in Newbridge in Midlothian and an experimental station (SBEU) in Sutton Bridge in Lincolnshire.

Agricultural experimental station
The agricultural experiment station is located alongside the River Nene between the Sutton Bridge Power Station and the A17 road. It occupies the former RAF Sutton Bridge airfield site that was acquired in 1958 by the Ministry of Agriculture. For many decades it has been at the forefront of research into potatoes in the UK.

See also
 Warwick HRI
 Rothamsted Research

References

External links
 

Food industry trade groups
Potato organizations
Department for Environment, Food and Rural Affairs
Agricultural marketing organizations
Agricultural organisations based in England
Organisations based in Warwickshire
Organisations based in Lincolnshire
Organizations established in 1997
Research institutes in Warwickshire
Science and technology in Lincolnshire
Agricultural research institutes in the United Kingdom
1997 establishments in England
Marketing boards